The Rhode Island Department of Environmental Management (RIDEM) is a Rhode Island state government agency charged with supervising and controlling the protection, development, planning, and utilization of the natural resources of the state, including, but not limited to: water, plants, trees, soil, clay, sand, gravel, rocks and other minerals, air, mammals, birds, reptiles, amphibians, fish, shellfish, and other forms of aquatic, insect, and animal life.

It includes the Division of Parks and Recreation which is responsible for management of Rhode Island's fifteen State Parks, seven state beaches, and five public use lands.

Predecessor agencies include:
 RI Metropolitan Park Commission (1904-1934)
 RI Division of Forests, Parks and Parkways (1935-1952)
 RI Department of Public Works (Parks and Recreation Division, 1952-1965)
 RI Department of Natural Resources (1965-1975)

The lobbying of the Public Parks Association (1883-1903) was a significant factor in the creation of state parks in Rhode Island.

References

External links
Guide to the Rhode Island Department of Environmental Management Office of Water Resources records from the Rhode Island State Archives
Guide to Department of Environmental Management Coastal Resources records from the Rhode Island State Archives
Guide to Department of Environmental Management Division of Compliance and Inspection records from the Rhode Island State Archives
Department of Environment digitized records from the Rhode Island State Archives
Rhode Island State Parks - PBS learning materials

Environmental Management
State environmental protection agencies of the United States